Honda Odyssey can refer to three motor vehicles manufactured by Honda:
 Honda Odyssey (ATV), an all-terrain vehicle (1977—1989)
 Honda Odyssey (minivan), a brand of two different Honda minivan models for different markets
 Honda Odyssey (international), sold in Japan and most other parts of the world
 Honda Odyssey (North America), sold primarily in the United States, Canada and Saudi Arabia

Odyssey